Ocenebra ingloria is a species of sea snail, a marine gastropod mollusk in the family Muricidae, the murex snails or rock snails.

Description
The length of the shell attains 18 mm.

References

External links
 MNHN, Paris: syntype
 Crosse H. (1865). Description d'espèces nouvelles. Journal de Conchyliologie. 13: 213-215
 Barco, A.; Herbert, G.; Houart, R.; Fassio, G. & Oliverio, M. (2017). A molecular phylogenetic framework for the subfamily Ocenebrinae (Gastropoda, Muricidae). Zoologica Scripta. 46 (3): 322-335.

Gastropods described in 1865
Ocenebra